Matías Marcos Gómez (born 10 August 1998) is an Argentine professional footballer who plays as a forward for Deportivo Morón.

Career
Gómez's first senior club became Gimnasia y Esgrima in 2018, when he was promoted into their first-team during the 2017–18 Argentine Primera División season. He was an unused substitute on 6 April during a fixture with Tigre, before receiving his professional debut a week later in a loss at home to Atlético Tucumán. He was selected three further times in his first season with the club. Gómez netted his first goal in a Copa Argentina tie with Olimpo in July, scoring the sole goal of a 1–0 win.

In January 2020, Gómez joined San Martín de Tucumán on loan for the rest of the season. He returned to Gimnasia in June 2020. In February 2021, Gómez signed with Primera Nacional side Deportivo Morón.

Career statistics
.

References

External links

1998 births
Living people
Sportspeople from Chaco Province
Argentine footballers
Association football forwards
Argentine Primera División players
Primera Nacional players
Club de Gimnasia y Esgrima La Plata footballers
San Martín de Tucumán footballers
Deportivo Morón footballers